Ellen Wilson may refer to:

Ellen Axson Wilson (1860–1914), American First Lady
Ellen Wilson (judoka) (born 1976), American judoka